Kevin J. Wilson is a New Zealand actor. He is best known for his performance as executive producer Sam Murphy on the satirical Frontline and his role as Senator Albinus on STARZ TV series Spartacus. He has also portrayed Sir Malcolm in the erotic soap opera Chances.

Filmography

Film 
 Skin Deep (1978)
 Pictures (1981)
 Wild Horses (1983)
 Kingpin (1985)
 Dangerous Orphans (1986)
 An Angel at My Table (1990)
 Chunuk Bair (1992)
 Lost Valley (1998)
 Spooked (2004)
 Luella Miller (2005)

Television 

 The Alpha Plan
 Pukemanu 
 The Mackenzie Affair  
 Loose Enz  
 Inside Straight 
 Roche 
 Chances 
 Shortland Street 
 G.P. 
 Marlin Bay  
 R.F.D.S.
 Frontline
 Xena: Warrior Princess
 Blood Crime  
 Mercy Peak 
 Ike: Countdown to D-Day
 Power Rangers R.P.M.
 Legend of the Seeker  
 Spartacus
 Terry Teo 
 The Shannara Chronicles

References

Year of birth missing (living people)
Living people
New Zealand male actors